Óscar Marcelino Álvarez (25 May 1948 – 28 April 2016) was an Argentine professional football player.

Club 
He played in Argentina for Banfield and Newell's Old Boys between 1968 and 1970 before reappearing in Greece.

PAS Giannina
In 1972, he played four years for Greek club PAS Giannina, scoring 77 goals and becoming the second highest scorer in the club's history.

Panathinaikos
In 1976, he was transferred to Greek giants Panathinaikos where he played until 1980, scoring 57 goals and becoming the ninth highest scorer in the club's history. He was part of the team that earned the 1976–77 double. In 1977 Alvarez was the third scorer of the Greek championship with 19 goals and in 1978 he placed in the second place of scorers with 18 goals.

Atromitos
In 1980, he was transferred to Atromitos where he played until his retirement in 1981.

Honours 
Panathinaikos
Greek Championship: 1976/1977
Greek Cup: 1976/1977
Balkans Cup: 1977

References

External links 
Oscar Alvarez bio (greek)

1948 births
2016 deaths
Argentine footballers
Club Atlético Banfield footballers
Newell's Old Boys footballers
PAS Giannina F.C. players
Panathinaikos F.C. players
Atromitos F.C. players
Argentine Primera División players
Super League Greece players
Argentine expatriate footballers
Greek people of Argentine descent
Sportspeople of Argentine descent
Naturalized citizens of Greece
Expatriate footballers in Greece
Association football forwards